The Bodie Mountains are a mountain range primarily in western Mineral County, Nevada.

They extend westward into Mono County, California, where they become the Bodie Hills with the mining district and town of Bodie, California.

The Sierra Nevada tower high to the west.

Bodie State Historic Park
The mining town of Bodie, California is now  a preserved ghost town in Bodie State Historic Park, designated a National Historic Landmark.

Roads to Bodie and beyond it allow ease of exploring the Bodie Mountains and Hills.

References

External links
 Official Bodie State Historic Park website
Bodie Hills area maps and information

Mountain ranges of Nevada
Mountain ranges of the Great Basin
Mountain ranges of Northern California
Mountain ranges of Mono County, California
Mountain ranges of Mineral County, Nevada